Ribautia mjoebergi is a species of centipede in the Geophilidae family. It is endemic to Australia, and was first described in 1925 by German myriapodologist Karl Wilhelm Verhoeff.

Description
The original description of this species is based on a female specimen measuring 60 mm in length with 81 pairs of legs.

Distribution
The species occurs in south-west Western Australia, the type locality being the Perth region.

Behaviour
The centipedes are solitary terrestrial predators that inhabit plant litter, soil and rotting wood.

References

 

 
mjoebergi
Centipedes of Australia
Endemic fauna of Australia
Fauna of Western Australia
Animals described in 1925
Taxa named by Karl Wilhelm Verhoeff